Dare County is the easternmost county in the U.S. state of North Carolina. As of the 2020 census, the population was 36,915. Its county seat is Manteo. Dare County is named after Virginia Dare, the first child born in the Americas to English parents, who was born within the county's current borders.  Founded in 1870 from parts of Tyrrell, Currituck and Hyde counties, it consists of a large segment of the Outer Banks of North Carolina, along with Roanoke Island and a peninsula of land attached to the mainland.  Most of the county consists of a string of resort communities along the Outer Banks.  While lightly populated by year-round residents, the population swells during the summer with vacationers.

Dare County is included in the Kill Devil Hills, NC Micropolitan Statistical Area, which is also included in the Virginia Beach-Norfolk, VA-NC Combined Statistical Area.

At one time, the now-abandoned town of Buffalo City was the largest community in the county.  Because it includes much of Pamlico Sound, Dare County is the largest county in North Carolina by total area, although if one were to consider land area only, it drops down to 68th in size among the state's 100 counties.

Geography

It is the largest county in North Carolina by area.

Dare County includes the middle part of the Outer Banks and contains Roanoke Island.

National protected areas
 Alligator River National Wildlife Refuge (part)
 Cape Hatteras National Seashore (part)
 Fort Raleigh National Historic Site
 Pea Island National Wildlife Refuge
 Wright Brothers National Memorial

State and local protected areas/sites 
 Bodie Island Lighthouse
 Buxton Woods Coastal Reserve Dedicated Nature Preserve
 Cape Hatteras Lighthouse
 Dare Game Lands (part)
 Hatteras Inlet Crab Spawning Sanctuary (part)
 Jockey's Ridge State Park
 Kitty Hawk Woods Coastal Reserve
 Kitty Hawk Woods Reserve
 Nags Head Woods Preserve Dedicated Nature Preserve
 Oregon Inlet Crab Spawning Sanctuary
 Pamlico Sound Mechanical Harvesting of Oysters Prohibited Area
 Roanoke Island Festival Park
 Roanoke Island Marshes Dedicated Nature Preserve
 Run Hill State Natural Area
 Run Hill State Natural Area Dedicated Nature Preserve
 Sandy Run Park

Major water bodies 
 Albemarle Sound
 Alligator River
 Atlantic Ocean
 Broad Creek
 Croatan Sound
 Currituck Sound
 East Lake
 Hatteras Bight
 Hatteras Inlet
 Intracoastal Waterway
 Long Shoal River
 Oregon Inlet
 Pamlico Sound
 Raleigh Bay
 Roanoke Sound
 Shallowbag Bay
 South Lake

Adjacent counties
 Currituck County – north
 Hyde County – southwest
 Tyrrell County – west

Major highways

Major Infrastructure 
 Dare County Bombing Range, within Alligator River National Wildlife Refuge.
 Dare County Regional Airport, a general aviation airport, is located in Dare County.
 First Flight Airport, inside Wright Brothers National Memorial
 Hatteras - Ocracoke Ferry (To Hyde County)
 Stumpy Point - Rodanthe Ferry, emergency route to the mainland during evacuations.

Demographics

2020 census

As of the 2020 United States census, there were 36,915 people, 15,529 households, and 10,281 families residing in the county.

2010 census
As of the census of 2010, there were 33,920 people, 12,690 households, and 8,450 families residing in the county.  The population density was 78 people per square mile (30/km2).  There were 26,671 housing units at an average density of 70 per square mile (27/km2).  The racial makeup of the county was 92.3% White, 2.5% Black or African American, 0.4% Native American, 0.6% Asian, 0.0% Pacific Islander, 2.4% from other races, and 1.8% from two or more races.  6.5% of the population were Hispanic or Latino of any race.

There were 12,690 households, out of which 27.3% had children under the age of 18 living with them, 55.0% were married couples living together, 8.1% had a female householder with no husband present, and 33.4% were non-families. 25.0% of all households were made up of individuals, and 7.9% had someone living alone who was 65 years of age or older.  The average household size was 2.34 and the average family size was 2.79.

In the county, the population was spread out, with 21.4% under the age of 18, 6.3% from 18 to 24, 30.8% from 25 to 44, 27.7% from 45 to 64, and 13.8% who were 65 years of age or older.  The median age was 40 years. For every 100 females there were 101.5 males.  For every 100 females age 18 and over, there were 100.2 males.

The median income for a household in the county was $42,411, and the median income for a family was $49,302. Males had a median income of $31,240 versus $24,318 for females. The per capita income for the county was $23,614.  About 5.5% of families and 8.0% of the population were below the poverty line, including 9.9% of those under age 18 and 5.3% of those age 65 or over.

Ancestry
As of 2010, the largest self-reported ancestry groups in Dare County were:

Government and politics
Dare County is presently a Republican county, having voted Republican since the 1980 election, though the Republican margins of victory are significantly smaller than most Southern largely-white counties. No Democratic presidential nominee has carried Dare County since Jimmy Carter did so in 1976. Before the 1950s, it was mostly a typical “Solid South” Democratic county, that did not vote Republican between 1900 and 1952, albeit by significantly smaller margins than much of the rest of the Solid South. Dare County is governed by the Dare County Board of Commissioners.  Dare County is a part of the Albemarle Commission regional council of governments.

Education
Public education is run by Dare County Schools. There are three public high schools/secondary schools with high school components:
 Cape Hatteras Secondary School
 First Flight High School
 Manteo High School

College of The Albemarle is the local community college, with a Dare campus in Manteo.

Dare County Library has branches in Manteo, Kill Devil Hills, and Hatteras.

Lighthouses
Dare County is home to two popular lighthouses: The Cape Hatteras Lighthouse and the Bodie Island Lighthouse. There is also a beacon atop the Wright Brothers Memorial. A third lighthouse was built by the Town of Manteo and dedicated on September 25, 2004. The Roanoke Marshes Lighthouse is an exterior recreation of the 1877 screwpile lighthouse of the same name and is located on the Manteo waterfront. It serves as exhibit space for the N.C. Maritime Museum on Roanoke Island.

Communities

Towns
 Duck
 Kill Devil Hills (largest town)
 Kitty Hawk
 Manteo (county seat)
 Nags Head
 Southern Shores

Census-designated places

 Avon
 Buxton
 Frisco
 Hatteras
 Manns Harbor
 Rodanthe
 Salvo
 Wanchese
 Waves

Unincorporated communities

 Colington
 East Lake
 Little Kinnekeet
 Martins Point
 Sanderling
 Scarborotown
 Stumpy Point

Townships
 Atlantic Township
 Croatan Township
 East Lake Township
 Hatteras Township
 Kinnekeet Township
 Nags Head Township

Ghost Towns
 Buffalo City (est: 1870s) (abandoned: 1950s) highest population: 3,000 (early 20th century)
 Burptoe Village (est: 1892) (abandoned: 1950) highest population: 616 (1942)
 Port Frenz (est: 1862 as Fort Frent) (abandoned: 1932) highest population: 602 (1924) (named as Fort Frent until 1865)

See also
 List of counties in North Carolina
 National Register of Historic Places listings in Dare County, North Carolina
 North Carolina Ferry System
 Hurricane Isabel, worst hurricane to hit Dare County to-date; causing widespread damage in the county
 Roanoke Colony, first attempted permanent English settlement in the Americas
 List of ghost towns in North Carolina
 North Carolina Aquarium on Roanoke Island
 North Carolina State Parks
 National Park Service

References

External links

 
 

 
Outer Banks
1870 establishments in North Carolina
Populated places established in 1870